Jawahar Navodaya Vidyalaya, Thrissur, locally known as JNV Mayannur, is a boarding, co-educational school in Thrissur district of Kerala state in India. Navodaya Vidyalayas are funded by the Indian Ministry of Human Resources Development and administered  by Navodaya Vidyalaya Smiti, an autonomous body under the ministry.

History 
This school was established in 1988, and is a part of Jawahar Navodaya Vidyalaya schools. This school's permanent campus is located at village Mayannur, Thrissur district. This school is administered and monitored by Hyderabad regional office of Navodaya Vidyalaya Smiti.

Admission 
Admission to JNV Thrissur at class VI level is made through selection test conducted by Navodaya Vidyalaya Smiti. The information about test is disseminated and advertised in the district by the office of Thrissur district magistrate (Collector), who is also the chairperson of Vidyalya Management Committee.

Affiliations 
JNV Thrissur is affiliated to Central Board of Secondary Education with affiliation number 940009, following the curriculum prescribed by CBSE.

See also 

 List of JNV schools
 List of Kendriya Vidyalayas
 Odisha Adarsha Vidyalaya - Emulation of the Navodaya Vidyalaya system

References

External links 

 Official Website of JNV Thrissur

High schools and secondary schools in Kerala
Thrissur
Educational institutions established in 1988
1988 establishments in Kerala
Thrissur district